Copelatus kammuriensis is a species of diving beetle. It is part of the genus Copelatus in the subfamily Copelatinae of the family Dytiscidae. It was described by Tamu & Tsukamoto in 1955.

References

kammuriensis
Beetles described in 1955